White Noise is the fifth studio album by Australian punk rock band The Living End, first released in Australia on 19 July 2008. It was the band's first album released on the record label Dew Process. A limited edition bonus DVD, recorded at ACDC Lane in Melbourne, was also released, featuring six live songs, four of which were songs from White Noise.

The album debuted at number two on the Australian Album Chart, achieving a Gold certification in its first week. It was nominated for Best Rock Album & Album of the Year at the 2008 ARIA Awards, winning the award for Best Rock Album 2008.

Background

Pre-recording
After a live show in late 2006, the band was placed on hiatus due to the fatigue of lead vocalist Chris Cheney. Cheney took a number of months off, doing yoga for relaxation and consequently, inspiration. White Noise got its first real kick-start when he came up with the guitar riff from the first track "How Do We Know?", saying he "took it to the guys and they said 'That's the direction, write another 12 of those'". Cheney has said the brief departure "was the turmoil that had to happen", but he "was back on track".

In February 2008, The Living End, under the alias of The Longnecks, played a small tour across Victoria to road-test songs they had written for their fifth studio album. They played a handful of dates and used the audience's reaction to the new material as a guide to which songs sounded better in a live environment.

Recording and production
Pre-production for the album took place at Studio One in Collingwood, Melbourne with producer Kalju Tonuma. This included various co-writes including the track "Sum of Us".  After the sonic blueprint of the album was established The Living End's new label suggested and assigned producer John Agnello, who has formerly done work with Sonic Youth and The Hold Steady. Band manager Rae Harvey selected Brendan O'Brien to mix and master the album. O'Brien begun work with The Living End literally a day after completing production on AC/DC's 2008 album Black Ice, and is notable for his work with high-profile bands such as Pearl Jam. These two were selected to help replicate their live sound inside a studio. The album was recorded by producer Agnello in April 2008, in New Jersey, United States.

Promotion
Only four days after the mastering of the album was completed, The Living End released a taster track titled "How Do We Know", which was posted on the Triple J website for download on 23 May 2008, available for one week only. Also as a promotion for the album a "White Noise Gizmo" was made available through the Nova Radio Station webpage, which Windows Vista users were able to download a taster of the album. This allowed two tracks a day to be heard from 14 to 18 July.

Track listing

Bonus CD ("Demos and Rarities")

DVD (Limited Edition)
All tracks recorded live at ACDC Lane, Melbourne.

B-Sides

Charts

Weekly charts

Year-end charts

Certifications

Personnel
The Living End
 Chris Cheney – vocals, guitar
 Scott Owen – double bass, backing vocals
 Andy Strachan – drums, backing vocals

Additional musicians
 Franz Nicolay (The Hold Steady) – keyboards & string arrangements
 Pinky Weitzman – viola
 Sarah Bernstein – violin
 Margaret White – violin
 Shandra Wolley – cello

Production
 Kalju Tonuma – pre-production & co-writing
 John Agnello – producer
 Brendan O'Brien – mixing
 Billy Bowers – pro tools engineer
 Dave Jones – mix assistant
 Kory Aaron – mix assistant

References

2008 albums
The Living End albums
Dew Process albums
Albums produced by John Agnello
ARIA Award-winning albums